Bernsen is a surname. Notable people with the surname include:

Corbin Bernsen (born 1954), American actor
Randy Bernsen (born 1954), American jazz guitarist
Rod Bernsen (born 1948), Los Angeles Police Department sergeant
 (born 1958), American actor